Neil Davies (4 December 1980) is a Welsh professional rugby league and rugby union footballer who played in the 2000s.

Background
Neil Davies was born in Aberdare, Wales.

International honours
Neil Davies won a cap for Wales while at Aberavon Fighting Irish 2004…2005 1(2?)-caps + 2-caps (interchange/substitute).

References

1980 births
Living people
Cardiff Demons players
Narberth RFC players
Neath Port Talbot Steelers players
Rugby league players from Aberdare
Rugby league second-rows
Rugby union players from Aberdare
Wales national rugby league team players
Welsh rugby league players
Welsh rugby union players